The Bellingham Chinooks were a minor league baseball team based in Bellingham, Washington. In 1938 and 1939. The Chinooks played as members of the Class B level Western International League, winning the 1938 league championship and hosting home games at Battersby Park. The Bellingham Chinooks were succeeded in Bellingham by the 1973 Bellingham Dodgers, who began play as members of the Northwest League.

History
In 1905, the Bellingham Gillnetters were the first minor league baseball team in Bellingham, Washington, playing the season as members of the four–team Class B level Northwestern League before folding.

Baseball resumed in Bellingham in 1938 with a championship season. The Bellingham Chinooks became members of the six–team Class B level Western International League and captured the league championship under manager Ken Penner. With a 68–65 regular season record, the Chinooks placed second in the regular season standings, finishing 9.5 games behind the first 1st place Yakima Pippins. In the 1938 playoffs, the Bellingham Chinooks defeated the Vancouver Maple Leafs three games to one and advanced. In the Final, Bellingham defeated the Yakima Pippins four games to three to become league champions.

The 1939 Bellingham Chinooks finished last in the Western International League standings and the franchise folded after the season. With a 40–102 regular season record, the Chinooks placed sixth in the six-team standings, playing under managers Ken Penner, Jimmie Reese and Al Lightner. Bellingham  finished behind the Wenatchee Chiefs (86–57), Tacoma Tigers (78–63), Vancouver Capilanos (76–63), Spokane Indians (75–69) and Yakima Pippins (72–73) in the final standings.

After the 1938 season, the Bellingham franchise was replaced in 1940 Western League play by the Salem Senators.

Bellingham was without a minor league team until the 1973 Bellingham Dodgers began play as members of the Class A level Northwest League.

The ballpark
The Bellingham Chinooks hosted home minor league games at Battersby Park. Battersby Park had a capacity of 3,000 and dimensions of (Left, Center, Right): 290–350–435. The ballpark was torn down in 1968. Today, Battersby Park is still in use as a public Park.

Timeline

Year–by–year records

Notable alumni

Rugger Ardizoia (1938)
Cliff Dapper (1938)
Bill Fleming (1938)
Billy Kelsey (1905)
Dave Odom (1938)
Ken Penner (1938–1939, MGR)
Jimmie Reese (1939, MGR) Los Angeles Angels Hall of Fame
Bill Rigney (1939) MLB All-Star
Wes Schulmerich (1938)
Bud Stewart (1939)
Jim Tyack (1938)

See also
Bellingham Chinooks players

References

External links
 Baseball Reference
 1939 team photo
 Battersby Park photo

Defunct minor league baseball teams
Defunct baseball teams in Washington (state)
Baseball teams established in 1938
Baseball teams disestablished in 1939
Bellingham, Washington
Whatcom County, Washington